Ibrahim K. Fofanah, also known as Ike Fofanah (born 13 February 1994) is a Sierra Leonean international footballer who plays professionally for Swedish club Syrianska IF Kerburan as a forward.

Career
Fofanah played for Kamboi Eagles, Wellington People and FC Kallon in Sierra Leone. In 2011, he was the Sierra Leone National Premier League top goal scorer with eight goals during the thirteen game season as well as voted best player of the league. He was also one of three nominees for the "2011 Sierra Leone Best Player" award, alongside European based players Teteh Bangura and Mohamed Bangura. 

Despite suffering from a broken leg injury at the start of his time with FC Kallon, he was still signed by Swedish club Djurgården who brought him to Sweden to help with his rehabilitation. In October 2013 Djurgården announced that they would not be extending Fofanahs contract and that he would leave the club at the end of the year. He then signed for Norwegian club HamKam in 2014.

He made his international debut for Sierra Leone in 2012.

References

1994 births
Living people
Sierra Leonean footballers
Sierra Leone international footballers
F.C. Kallon players
Djurgårdens IF Fotboll players
Sierra Leonean expatriate footballers
Expatriate footballers in Sweden
Sierra Leonean expatriate sportspeople in Sweden
Syrianska IF Kerburan players
Association football forwards